Mirra may refer to:

 Mırra, traditional type of bitter coffee in Turkey and some Arabic countries
 Mirra chair, chair designed by Herman Miller
 Anthony Mirra, an American mobster, soldier and later caporegime for the Bonanno crime family
 Dave Mirra, an American BMX rider who later competed in rallycross racing
 David Mirra, a former professional Australian rules footballer
 Mirra Alfassa spiritual guru, an occultist and a collaborator of Sri Aurobindo